The Chamber Orchestra of Europe (COE), established in 1981, is an orchestra based in London. The orchestra comprises about 60 members from across Europe. The players pursue parallel careers as international soloists, members of chamber groups and as tutors and teachers of music. The orchestra receives substantial support from the Gatsby Charitable Foundation and the Underwood Trust; they have no single home resident hall and no appointed resident conductor. The orchestra is a registered charity under English law.

The idea for the COE came from musicians in the European Community Youth Orchestra, from members who were past the age limit for the ECYO and who wanted to continue working together in a chamber orchestra context. The founding members included the oboist Douglas Boyd, who served as the COE's principal oboist from 1981 to 2002. Over the years the COE has developed strong relationships with Claudio Abbado, Bernard Haitink and Nikolaus Harnoncourt, together with Thomas Adès, Pierre-Laurent Aimard, Emanuel Ax, Lisa Batiashvili, Joshua Bell, Paavo Berglund, Renaud Capuçon and Gautier Capuçon, Isabelle Faust, Janine Jansen, Vladimir Jurowski, Leonidas Kavakos, Radu Lupu, Yannick Nézet-Séguin, Sakari Oramo, Murray Perahia, Maria João Pires, Sir András Schiff and Rolando Villazon.

The COE performs regularly in the major cities of Europe, with occasional visits to the United States, Hong Kong, Japan and Australia. The orchestra has strong links with the Alte Oper in Frankfurt, the Styriarte festival in Graz, the Lucerne Festival, as well as the Kölner Philharmonie in Cologne, the Philharmonie de Paris and the Concertgebouw in Amsterdam. From 2007 to 2013, the COE was appointed cultural Ambassador by the European Union in its culture programme. The COE created the COE Academy in 2009 in order to provide opportunities to gifted music students to study with COE musicians.

Recordings
The orchestra has made over 250 commercial recordings for all the major recording companies with various conductors, including Claudio Abbado, Paavo Berglund, Nikolaus Harnoncourt, and Yannick Nézet-Séguin. The orchestra has won a number of prizes for its recordings, including three Gramophone Awards for the Record of the Year and two Grammys. The COE was the first orchestra to create its own label, COE Records, in association with ASV Records (now distributed by Sanctuary/Universal Music).

Honorary members
The orchestra has awarded honorary membership to selected special collaborators: Nikolaus Harnoncourt, Alice Harnoncourt, Bernard Haitink, Sir András Schiff and Yannick Nézet-Séguin.

See also
European Union Baroque Orchestra
European Union Chamber Orchestra
European Union Youth Orchestra

External links

References

1981 establishments in England
Musical groups established in 1981
European orchestras
Chamber orchestras
Charities based in London
Pan-European music organizations